The 3rd Algerian Tirailleurs Regiment (3e R.T.A) was an infantry unit of the Army of Africa in the French Army. Recruited primarily from Algerian Muslims, it was mainly commanded by French officers. The racial boundaries were not absolute, with some French volunteers serving in the ranks and a limited number of Muslims being appointed as officers. After 1913 a selective form of conscription was applied to Algerian Muslims but the majority of Muslim soldiers serving in the 3e R.T.A continued to be voluntarily enlisted.

During its existence from 1842 to 1962, the regiment distinguished itself in the intervention in Mexico, during the Battle of San Lorenzo, which earned the regiment the Légion d'honneur and specially during World War II during which, commanded by Colonel François de Linares then Colonel Agostini at the corps of the 3rd Algerian Infantry Division 3e DIA, the regiment was cited four times at the orders of the armed forces.

The 3e RTA was one of the five most-decorated French regiments of the Second World War; along with the 4th Tunisian Tirailleurs Regiment (4e RTT), the 2nd Moroccan Tabors Group, the Chad Marching Regiment and the 13th Demi-Brigade of the Foreign Legion.

Names 
 1842 : 3rd Indigenous Battalion of Constantine
 1856 : 3rd Algerian Tirailleurs Regiment, 3e RTA
 1962 : disbanded

The regiment originated as the indigenous (locally recruited Muslim) Battalion of Constantine, created in Algeria in 1842. In 1856 the battalion was designated as the 3e RTA. The regiment was dissolved in 1962.

History

1815 to 1848 
French conquest of Algeria
 Regiments having participated to the conquest of Algeria by France

Second French Empire

Franco-Prussian War of 1870 

On August 1, 1870, the 3rd Algerian Tirailleurs Regiment formed part of the Army of the Rhin.

Together with the 87th Infantry Regiment commanded by Colonel Blot, the 3rd formed the 2nd Brigade under the orders of Général Lacretelle. This 2nd Brigade, together with the 1st Brigade of Général Fraboulet de Kerléadec, two batteries of artillery plus one of mitrailleuse, and one engineer company constituted the 4th Infantry Division commanded by Général de division de Lartigue.
The division was part of the 1st Army Corps with Marshal Patrice de MacMahon, Duke of Magenta as commanding general.

On August 17, 1870, the 3rd Algerian Tirailleurs Regiment was part of the Army of Châlons.

With the 87th Infantry Regiment of Colonel Blot, the 2nd Marching Regiment of Lt-Colonel de Lenchey and the 3rd Battalion of the 3rd Grenadiers of the Guard, the 3rd formed the 2nd Brigade at the orders of Général Carrey de Bellemare. This 2nd Brigade with the 1st Brigade of Général Fraboulet de Kerléadec, two batteries de 4 and one de mitrailleuse, and one engineer company constituted the 4th Infantry Division commanded by Général de brigade de Lartigue. The division was part of the 1st Army Corps with Général de division Auguste-Alexandre Ducrot as commanding general.

World War I

1914
 Vers Charleroi : Oret, Mettet (August 23), Florennes (August 24)
 Unfolding of the IIIrd Army and IV Army: Courgivaux, Petit-Morin
 Battle of the Marne : Cuts-la-Pommeraye (September 15–17)

1915
Ist Army and IIIrd Army in Argonne and one Meuse: Plateau des Loges
 September 25 - October 6 : Second Battle of Champagne Épine de Védegrange

1916
Battle of Verdun : Louvemont, Côte-du-Poivre (February), Souville (July) 
 Apprehending of the Forts de Douaumont and Forts de Vaux: Bois le Chaume, Bezonveaux (December 15)

1917
 Verdun: Côte 304

1918
 Moreuil (August 8)
 Battle of Noyon (August 28)
 Chauny, Tergnier

World War II

Composition of the regiment 
During the Second World War, one North-African tirailleur regiment consisted a little more than 3000 men (out of which 500 officers and sous-officiers) and 200 vehicles. The proportion of Maghrebis reach 69% for the regiment, 74% for the battalion, 79% for the company of fusiliers-voltigeurs, 52% for the anti-tank company and 36% for the cannon infantry company.

Campaigns 
In 1943, the 3e RTA formed part of the Marching Division of Constantibe, subsequently designated as the 3rd Algerian Infantry Division. The regiment earned distinction in Tunisia then during the Italian campaign: first in January 1944 while apprehending Monna Acquafondata, then Operation Diadem in May 1944. The regiment was cited twice during that campaign, carrying the inscriptions: "Abruzzes 1944" and "Rome 1944" on its colours.

Disembarked at Provence on August 15, 1944, the 3e DIA entered first to Toulon, participated to the Liberation of Marseille, manoeuver during which the 3e and 7e RTA formed the forward contingent. The regiment made way towards the Alpes and Jura, until the Alsace. Accordingly, the regiment then mounted the confrontations in the Vosges, apprehended Mulhouse and mounted the defensive of Strasbourg at Kilstett, in January 1945.

The 3e DIA mounted the assault on the Siegfried line, reached the Rhin at Spire and apprehended Stuttgart. Since Naples, the 3e DIA endured the loss of 4000 killed and 12,000 wounded.

Collective citations 
Throughout the course of Second World War, the 3e RTA obtained 7 collective citations at the orders of the armed forces (4 for the regiment and 3 for the battalions).

Casualties 
The 3e DIA recorded 811 killed in action in the 3e RTA from November 1942 to May 1945, out of which 614 Maghrebis (75%) and 197 Europeans (25%).

Since 1945 
In the spring of 1947, the following tirailleur units were disembarked at Saigon: the B.M of the 1st, 2nd, 3e RTA, 7e RTA and the 4e RTT, and the 25e, 23e and 27e BTA. All eight of these battalions, were repatriated from Indo China to North Africa within 24 to 30 months. 
 1954 : Battle of Dien Bien Phu

Disbandment  
Following the campaign in Indochina, the regiment returned to Algeria. Following the outbreak of the Algerian War in 1954 the 3e RTA was involved in active service in the region of Constantine. 
 In 1955, the regiment provided support for the creation of the 3rd Company Group of Algerian Nomades (1st, 2nd, 3rd Algerian Nomades Companies)
 At the end of the Algerian War in 1962, the majority of the units formerly comprising the French Army of Africa were disbanded. Algerian Muslim conscripts were demobilised while long service volunteers were given the option of transferring to other units of the French Army. The 3e RTA was amongst the regiments dissolved.

Traditions

Regimental Colors

Decorations 

The regimental colors of the 3rd Algerian Tirailleurs Regiment are decorated with:

 Croix of the Légion d'honneur in 1863 for the capture of two flags on May 8, 1863 during the Battle of San Lorenzo, by tirailleur Ahmed Ben Miloud, who was awarded the Médaille militaire ;
 Croix de guerre 1914–1918 with:
  2 palms and 1 silver star 
 Croix de guerre 1939-1945 with:
 Four palms.
 Médaille d'Or de la Ville de Milan

Fourragere:
 The Regimental Colors bear wearing the fourragere with colors of the Médaille militaire with olives of the colors of the Croix de Guerre 1914–1918

Honours

Battle honours
Artois 1915
Champagne 1915
Verdun 1916
Soissonnais 1918
Picardy 1918
Aisne 1918
Levant 1920-–1921
Morocco 1925–1926
Fondouk El Okbi 1943
Rome 1944
Marseille 1944
Vosges 1944
Indochine 1947–1954
AFN 1952–1962

Regimental Commanders
 1811 - ...  :  Colonel commandant Adrien 
 1818 - ...  :  Chef de bataillon Frédéric 
 1825 - ... :  Lieutenant Dieudonné
 1870 :  Colonel Gandil 
 1870 :  Colonel Barrué
 1905 - ...  :  Colonel Gabriel (1849-1930)
 World War I
 Until August 25, 1914 : Colonel Simon, provisionary command was assured by commandant Demaris
 From September 19, 1914 to April 28, 1916 : Lieutenant-colonel de Gouvello 
 From April 28 to August 6, 1916 : Colonel Thouvenel, provisionary command was assured by Commandant Gonnel then Commandant Le Clerc 
 From August 26 to October 7, 1916 : Colonel Simon  
 Since October 7, 1916 : Lieutenant-colonel Vibert 
 World War II
 19/09/1943 – 15/09/1944: Colonel de Linarès
 15/09/1944 – March 1945: Colonel Agostini
 March 1945 - ... : Colonel de la Boisse
 1958 - ...  : Général Gandoet commanding the 19th Infantry Division

See also 
Moroccan Division

References

Bibliography
 Historique du 3e régiment de Tirailleurs algériens : ouvrage rédigé d'après les ordres de M. le colonel Boitard, G. Heim, Constantine (Algérie), 1888, 582 p.
 Le 3e Régiment de Tirailleurs Algériens pendant la campagne d'Italie (janvier-août 1944), Vie exaltante, numéro 20, Éditions de la nouvelle France, Paris, 1945.
 Livre d'or de la 3e division d'infanterie algérienne. Fribourg-en-Brisgau: Imprimerie nationale, 1948. 
 Par les portes du Nord : la libération de Toulon et de Marseille en 1944, Nouvelles Éditions Latines, 2005.  

Tirailleurs regiments of France
Armée d’Afrique
Military units and formations established in 1856
Military units and formations disestablished in 1962